The Rio Salado is a tributary of the Rio Grande in the U.S. state of New Mexico. The name Río Salado is Spanish for "salty river".

Course
The Rio Salado originates in northeastern Catron County. It flows east, then north, then southeast through Cow Spring Canyon. It is joined by Miguel Chavez Canyon from the north, which it then flows through, turning eastward. Kicking Bear Wash joins from the north, after which the Rio Salado enters Socorro County. It continues to flow east through Miguel Chavez Canyon, collecting minor tributaries. A longer tributary, Alamocita Creek, joins from the southwest. Then Gallegos Creek joins from the north. Rio Salado passes between Table Mountain and Tres Hermanos Mesa. Alamo Creek and Jaralosa Creek join from the south, then Cottonwood Draw from the north. Rio Salado then passes by Puertecito, after which it is joined by Cañada Bonita from the north. It continues to flow east, joined by a number of minor tributaries flowing from the Bear Mountains and Ladron Peak. As Rio Salado passes through the Sevilleta National Wildlife Refuge it is joined by La Jenica Creek, Silver Creek, and Arroyo Rendija, from the south, and Cañada Popotosa and Arroyo Tio Lino from the north.

Along its course the Rio Salado passes along the northern edge of the Cibola National Forest.

See also
 List of rivers of New Mexico
 List of tributaries of the Rio Grande

References

Tributaries of the Rio Grande
Rivers of New Mexico
Rivers of Catron County, New Mexico
Rivers of Socorro County, New Mexico